Kevin Spencer is a Canadian adult animated comedy developed by Greg Lawrence. It originally ran on The Comedy Network from October 31, 1998 to December 4, 2005. A total of 113 episodes aired over the course of 8 seasons.

Series overview

Episodes

Season 1 (1998)

Season 2 (1999)

Season 3 (2000-01)

Season 4 (2001-02)

Season 5 (2003)

Season 6 (2004)

Season 7 (2004-05)

Season 8 (2005)

References

External links

Lists of comedy television series episodes
Lists of Canadian television series episodes